Herrontown Woods Arboretum (142 acres) is an arboretum located on Snowden Lane near the junction with Herrontown Road, in Princeton, New Jersey. It is open to the public every day at no cost.  There are walking trails, but trail bicycles are prohibited.

Description

This land is preserved in its natural state (except for a pipeline right-of-way, which crosses the woods). It contains a pine forest, wetlands, frogs and salamanders, over 30 species of trees, shrubs, and flowers, rare birds, rocks containing magnetite, and several miles of walking trails.

History

Herrontown Woods

The first  of the arboretum were donated to the Mercer County Park Commission in 1957 by internationally renowned mathematician Prof. Oswald Veblen (1880-1960) of the Institute for Advanced Study.  The gift was valued at $154,000 and was the town of Princeton's first nature preserve.  In 1966 the Park Commission approved a  expansion of the Woods.  When Elizabeth Veblen died in 1974, the Veblens' remaining  were added to the park, including a cottage and house, giving the park its current size.

Autumn Hill Reservation

In 1967 Princeton Township and Princeton Borough jointly purchased  of former hardscrabble farms returned to woodland, north of Herrontown Road, across the street from the arboretum, for preservation as the Autumn Hill Reservation.  This stretch of land is sometimes referred to as the Herrontown Woods extension.  The reservation has only a rudimentary trail loop, the work of an Eagle Scout service project by Boy Scout Troop 43.  A small parking lot on Herrontown, west of its junction with Snowden, provides access.

Trail access

The woods can be accessed from a parking lot off of Snowden Lane on the east side of the arboretum.  In 2010, an adjoining  tract of land owned by All Saints Episcopal Church was purchased for preservation by the D&R Greenway Land Trust.  This enabled trails to be added reaching to the south, accessing both the church and the former Church & Dwight headquarters on Bunn Drive.

In October, 2014, trail access was added from Stone Hill Church, on the west side of the woods, off Bunn Drive, through the joint effort of the Friends of Herrontown Woods and the church youth group.  Visitors are free to park at the church, apart from Sunday mornings, to access the trails.

Gallery

See also 
 List of botanical gardens in the United States

References

External links
Herrontown Woods Arboretum

Arboreta in New Jersey
Botanical gardens in New Jersey
Parks in Mercer County, New Jersey
Princeton, New Jersey
County parks in New Jersey